Ramrao Madhavrao Deshmukh was a prominent political and academic personality from Amravati, Maharashtra. He was one of the very few barristers from the region at that time.

Political life
He has been a member of and has presided over many important political establishments during and after the British Rule. Some of the important establishments that he has been associated with and his position in those establishments are stated below:
 Central Provinces and Berar Legislative Council, Member. Time Frame: 1920–25, 1927–30 and 1937–41
 Government Of Central Provinces and Berar, Minister. Time Frame: 1927–28, 1929–30 and 1937–38.
 Gwalior State, Minister. Time Frame: 1941–44
 High Commissioner for India in the Union of South Africa. Time Frame: 1945–47
 Rewa State, Prime Minister. Time Frame: 1947–48
 Central Legislative Assembly, Member. Time Frame: 1926–27
 Rajya Sabha, Member. Time Frame:  3-4-1952 to 2-4-1958 and 3-4-1958 to 2-4-1964
 Padmabhushan – 1971.

References

1981 deaths
1892 births
Rajya Sabha members from Maharashtra
People from Amravati
Recipients of the Padma Bhushan in trade and industry
History of Gwalior
Marathi politicians